Ivan Belsky may refer to:

 Ivan Vladimirovich Belsky ( 1422–1445), first prince of the Gediminid Belsky family 
 Ivan Feodorovich Belsky ( 1501–1542), principal Gediminid Belsky in the Kazan-campaign and regency periods 
 Ivan Dmitrievich Belsky (died 1571), last prince of the Gediminid Belsky family
 Ivan Ivanovich Belsky (1719–1799), Russian painter

See also:
 "Ivan Belsky", rare corruption of Ivan Betskoy (1704–1795), Russian noble and education administrator